Eucalyptus apodophylla, commonly known as whitebark, is a small to medium-sized tree that is endemic to northern Australia. It has smooth, powdery white bark, broadly lance-shaped to egg-shaped adult leaves, flower buds in groups of seven, white flowers and hemispherical to conical fruit.

Description
Flowering occurs from July to September and the flowers are white.

Taxonomy and naming
Eucalyptus apodophylla was first formally described in 1934 by William Blakely and Wilfred Surrey Jacobs and the description was published in Blakely's book, A Key to the Eucalypts. The specific epithet (apodophylla) means "leaves without a foot", possibly referring to the lack of a petiole, although a petiole is usually present.

The whitebark belongs to the Subexsertae series and sub-series Applanatae, along with E. bigalerita, E. platyphylla, E. tintinnans and E. houseana.

Distribution
Whitebark grows in a range of habitats, usually in low-lying, seasonally flooded areas or swamps but also among sandstone outcrops where it grows in sand, clay or loam soils. It is found in the Top End of the Northern Territory and in the central and northern parts of the Kimberley region of Western Australia.

See also

List of Eucalyptus species

References

Eucalypts of Western Australia
Trees of Australia
apodophylla
Myrtales of Australia
Plants described in 1934
Taxa named by William Blakely